Salarias guttatus, the breast-spot blenny or the blue-spot blenny, is a species of combtooth blenny found in the western Pacific Ocean.  This species reaches a length of  TL.

References

External links
 

guttatus
Taxa named by Achille Valenciennes
Fish described in 1836